The MaK G 1205 is a class of four axle B'B' diesel-hydraulic locomotives built by the Maschinenbau Kiel factory.

Description and operations
The locomotives are of a similar design to the MaK G 1204 BB locomotives, with hydraulic transmission, B'B' wheel arrangement, and off-centre cab.

The first twelve locomotives were built for the Eisenbahn und Hafen in Duisburg, Germany, and were powered by a V 12 Caterpillar engine, the remainder were powered by a similarly powered V 12 MTU engine also used on the MaK G 1204 BB. The Voith hydraulic converter is the same as that used on the MaK G 1204 BB and MaK G 1202 BB.

Of the 19 MTU engined versions 6 were built for NISCO (National Iranian Steel Company), 10 have worked for a variety of German private railway companies, 1 for Graz-Köflacher Eisenbahn- und Bergbaugesellschaft mbH in Austria, and 2 for Banverket in Sweden.

See also
The Belgian Railways Class 77, of which 170 were built, is a development of the design.

References

External links

Images 

MaK locomotives
Diesel locomotives of Iran
Standard gauge locomotives of Austria
Standard gauge locomotives of Germany
Standard gauge locomotives of Iran
Standard gauge locomotives of Sweden
Railway locomotives introduced in 1991